The Manly-Warringah District Junior Rugby League (MWDJRL) and North Sydney District Junior Rugby League (NSDJRL) is an amateur rugby league competition for senior and junior rugby league clubs in Sydney's Northern Suburbs.

History

Current Senior Clubs

All District clubs

See also

 Balmain District Junior Rugby League
 Cronulla-Sutherland District Rugby Football League
 Parramatta Junior Rugby League
 Penrith District Rugby League
 South Sydney District Junior Rugby Football League
 Sydney Roosters Juniors
 Rugby League Competitions in Australia

References

External links
Manly Warringah District Junior Rugby League
North Sydney District Junior Rugby League

Rugby league competitions in New South Wales
Rugby league in Sydney
Amateur rugby league
Manly Warringah Sea Eagles
North Sydney Bears